The Alsco 300 was a NASCAR Xfinity Series race held at Kentucky Speedway in Sparta, Kentucky, United States. The distance of the race was 300 miles (482.803 km).

History
Kentucky Speedway, opened in 2000 by Jerry Carrol, held its first Busch Series race in 2001. Brad Paisley sang the National Anthem, and then-Cincinnati Bengals player Corey Dillon gave the command to start engines. This race saw Travis Kvapil go upside down after clipping Rich Bickle's No. 59 car off of Turn 2, and the car slid all the way down the backstretch in the turn three grass. Kevin Harvick won the inaugural event.

Hypermarket chain Meijer was the race's sponsor since 2003 after previous sponsorship from Outback Steakhouse and Kroger. Nabisco, through its Oreo and Ritz brands, had been an associate sponsor since the 2002 race. For 2011, the race was sponsored by the Nonprofit organization Feed The Children. Starting in 2016, the race was sponsored by Alsco. In 2017, Alsco signed a multi-year agreement to continue being the sponsor of the NASCAR XFINITY Series race. Alsco is one of only two companies to serve as entitlement sponsor of multiple Xfinity Series events. Each year Alsco provides its sponsorship partners, employees, customer and prospects with over 1,500 tickets to the race.

The race received a doubleheader in 2020 due to the COVID-19 pandemic. The second race, the Shady Rays 200, was held the day before the Alsco 300.

Kentucky was removed from the 2021 Xfinity schedule.

David Gilliland won here for an underfunded team in 2006 with 8 starts in his résumé. This win gave him the ride in the 38 car in mid-2006, replacing Elliott Sadler in the 38 car. Joey Logano is the first repeat winner, winning three straight years from 2008 to 2010. Also, four different drivers have won at Kentucky Speedway to claim their first Nationwide Series win. David Gilliland (2006), Stephen Leicht (2007), Joey Logano (2008), and Austin Dillon (2012).

Past winners

2002: Race started on Saturday night but was finished on Sunday afternoon due to rain.
2013: Race shortened due to rain.
2016: Race extended due to overtime.
2017: Race postponed from Friday night to Saturday afternoon due to severe weather.

Multiple winners (drivers)

Multiple winners (teams)

Manufacturer wins

Notable races
2008: When Joey Logano won, he became the youngest winner in Nationwide Series history, at 18 years old, 21 days, shattering Casey Atwood's record (18 years, 313 days) that stood since 1999.
2013: Rain struck Sparta as Feed the Children 300 ending short and the Quaker State 400 was moved to Sunday afternoon. Brad Keselowski won the rain-shortened race and would go on to get wrecked on Sunday as Kurt Busch turned into Keselowski. This may have started the Kurt Busch vs. Keselowski rivalry that would go on to the 2014 5-hour Energy 400.
2014: Brad Keselowski overcame a speeding penalty to get a top 5 finish. Kevin Harvick held off a charging Kyle Busch and Brad Keselowski.

References

External links
 

2001 establishments in Kentucky
2020 establishments in Kentucky
Former NASCAR races
NASCAR Xfinity Series races
 
Recurring sporting events established in 2001
Recurring sporting events disestablished in 2020